The Australian Football League's 2005 finals series began on the weekend of 2 September 2005 and ended with the 109th AFL Grand Final at the Melbourne Cricket Ground on 24 September 2005. The Sydney Swans defeated West Coast, breaking their record 72-year drought between premierships. The top eight teams on the home and away rounds (regular season) ladder qualify for the Finals Series.

Ladder

Separated only by percentage Adelaide (minor premier) and West Coast topped the ladder (W-L: 17–5), trailed by third placed Sydney (15–7). The matchups for the first round of finals were only set after all matches of the final home-and-away game had been completed.

Summary of results

The finals system

The system is a final eight system. This system is different from the McIntyre final eight system, which was previously used by the AFL, and was used by the National Rugby League until 2012.

The top four teams in the eight receive what is popularly known as the "double chance" when they play in week-one qualifying finals; this means that if a top-four team loses in the first week, it still has a chance to redeem itself by getting a chance to play in a semi-final the next week against the winner of an elimination final. The bottom four of the eight are forced to play what are called elimination finals, in which only the winners survive and move on to week two to play the losers of the qualifying finals.

In the second week, the winners of the qualifying finals receive a bye to the third week, while the losers of those qualifying finals must play the winners of the elimination finals for a chance to play the qualifying finals winners. Home-ground advantage goes to the team with the higher seed.

In the third week, the winners of the semi-finals from week two play the winners of the qualifying finals in the first week, with the latter receiving home-ground advantage. The winners of those matches move on to the Grand Final at the Melbourne Cricket Ground in Melbourne, where the new premier will be crowned.

The favourites for the 2005 Grand Final were Adelaide, St Kilda, Sydney and West Coast.

8TeamBracket-PagePlayoff|RD2-RD3-cross=y|team-width=150 Explained (AFL.com.au)

Week One

First Qualifying Final (1 vs 4)

Scorecard

Second Qualifying Final (2 vs 3)

Scorecard

Sydney entered the game as the in form team of the competition.  West Coast topped the ladder most of the season, and were only denied the minor premiership on percentage.  The Eagles led the game most of the first half, but the Swans appeared to be marching onward to victory by taking control of the third quarter.  In a foreshadowing of things to come, West Coast responded by taking control of the fourth quarter.  Two controversial fourth quarter umpiring decisions against Sydney hurt their cause.  Even more damaging were two late marks in defence by Eagle Dean Cox snubbing Swan attempts to kick a game winner.

First Elimination Final (5 vs 8)

Scorecard

Second Elimination Final (6 vs 7)

Scorecard

Week Two

First Semi-final

Scorecard

Second Semi-final

Scorecard

A thrilling victory for Sydney, and a heartbreaking loss for Geelong. The game seemed decided, with Geelong ahead by 23 points early in the final quarter - Sydney needed four goals to win, and had kicked only three for the night. But the Swans did come back, with Nick Davis kicking all four of the final quarter goals, including the game-winner with less than ten seconds remaining.

Week Three

First Preliminary Final

Scorecard 

Sydney opened the game strongly, but once St. Kilda righted their effort they took the lead and steadily built upon it. Leading by 15 points midway through the third quarter, the Saints were on the verge of putting the game out of reach but they were unable to match Sydney's endurance. In the final quarter the Swans blew the game out of reach by kicking seven un-answered goals.

The Swans' win reversed two heavy losses to the Saints within the past twelve months, the latter of which proved to be a major turning point in their 2005 season.

Second Preliminary Final

Scorecard

Grand final

External links
 Some highlights from the 2005 AFL Grand Final at Google Videos
 AFL official website
 Yahoo! Sport Australia/New Zealand (news)
 RealFooty by The Age (Melbourne) Online 
 SportsAustralia (news and views)

AFL Finals Series
Finals Series